Slicing may refer to:
 Array slicing, an operation on an array in computer science
 Chinese salami slicing strategy
 Object slicing, an object-oriented programming issue
 Program slicing, a set of software engineering methods
 Slicing, a mechanical process, see Cutting
 Slicing (interface design), image slicing for web design and interface design
 Slow slicing, a Chinese form of torture and execution
 Slicing (3D printing), the software operation of producing a G-code file from a 3D model file, in preparation for 3D printing.

See also 
 Slice (disambiguation)